Denbigh Cockpit is a reconstructed building at St Fagans National Museum of History in Cardiff, the capital of Wales. The cockpit formerly stood in the yard of the Hawk and Buckle Inn at Vale Street, Denbigh, and is thought to date from the late seventeenth century.  It is a Grade II listed building.

Cockfighting became illegal in Britain in 1849, and the cockpit was used for other purposes over the years, such as a garage.  In 1911 it was visited by members of the Royal Commission on the Ancient and Historical Monuments and Constructions in Wales and Monmouthshire, and was found to be "preserved with much care". It was in a poor state of repair by 1965, when a decision was made to move it to St Fagans.  The cockpit was opened to the public at St Fagans in 1970.

References

Buildings and structures completed in the 17th century
St Fagans National Museum of History
Relocated buildings and structures in Wales
Grade II listed buildings in Cardiff
17th-century architecture in the United Kingdom
Thatched buildings in Wales